Cockell is a surname. Notable people with the surname include:

Charles S. Cockell (born 1967), British astrobiologist
Don Cockell (1928–1983), English boxer
Jenny Cockell (born 1953)
Merrick Cockell (born 1957), British politician

See also
John Mills-Cockell (born 1943), Canadian composer